Casper Terho (born 24 June 2003) is a Finnish professional football player who plays for Jupiler Pro League club Union SG.

Club career 
Casper Terho made his professional debut for Helsingin Jalkapalloklubi on the 26 August 2020, coming on as a substitute in the Veikkausliiga 2-0 home win against Seinäjoen Jalkapallokerho. Along with other youngsters such as Kai Meriluoto, he played a few other games by the end of season, where his team ended up winning the 2020 championship. He has also played for HJK reserve team Klubi 04 in Kakkonen and Ykkönen.

Being already viewed as one of the brightest hopes from the Finnish champions academy, he scored his first goal in his 2021 season debuts, during the 4-2 home championship win against FC Honka on the 24 April 2021. By the end of May, he became a regular starter with HJK, scoring another goal against Ilves, while still aged only 17.

On 29 September 2022, Belgian side Union SG announced that they had reached an agreement with Helsinki about his transfer. He joined the Belgian side on 1 January 2023. He officially made his debut for the club on 8 January against Anderlecht, as a 77th minute substitute.

International career 
Terho is a youth international for Finland, taking part in the 2020 Euro under-17 qualifications, where Finland topped their pool with Czech Republic, Bosnia and Herzegovina and Moldova, although the final stage of the tournament was eventually canceled due to the covid pandemic.

Honours

HJK
 Veikkausliiga: 2020

References

External links

2003 births
Living people
Finnish footballers
Finland youth international footballers
Finland under-21 international footballers
Association football midfielders
Klubi 04 players
Helsingin Jalkapalloklubi players
Royale Union Saint-Gilloise players
Kakkonen players
Veikkausliiga players
Ykkönen players
Belgian Pro League players
Finnish expatriate footballers
Expatriate footballers in Belgium
Finnish expatriate sportspeople in Belgium